Samurai is the 45th official video game for the Philips Videopac. in North America, the same game as released as Dynasty! for the Magnavox Odyssey² console.

The game is identical to the game Reversi. It also contains two-player mode, gameplay against the computer, as well as a digital timing handicap which allows newcomers to have a better chance in beating grandmaster players in the game. Similar to other Videopac games, the game did not compare favorably to those for Atari's consoles.

References

External links
 Classic Consoles Center

1979 video games
Magnavox Odyssey 2 games
Video games developed in the United States